Hughen William Riley (born 12 June 1947) is an English former footballer who played for Rochdale, Crewe Alexandra, Bury and Bournemouth.

Career Statistics

References

Rochdale A.F.C. players
Crewe Alexandra F.C. players
Bury F.C. players
Bournemouth F.C. players
Living people
1947 births
English footballers
Association football midfielders